Providence Health & Services is a not-for-profit, Catholic health care system operating multiple hospitals and medical clinics across seven states, with headquarters in Renton, Washington. The health system includes 51 hospitals, more than 800 non-acute facilities and numerous assisted living facilities on in the Western United States (Alaska, Washington, Oregon, and California) as well as Montana, New Mexico, and Texas. Providence Health & Services was founded by the Sisters of Providence in 1859 and merged with St. Joseph Health in 2016.

In recent years the company has been the subject of several controversies. A New York Times investigation revealed a Providence program pressured low-income patients to make payments to the company, even though the hospital was supposed to give them free care in exchange for tax benefits. The newspaper also found that the company received more than $500 million in government funds intended for hospitals at risk of going under while the hospital chain had nearly $12 billion in cash reserves.

History 
Providence Health System was established by the Sisters of Providence, a community of Roman Catholic sisters founded in Montreal, Quebec in the 1850s, who established a mission at Fort Vancouver and a hospital in Portland.  In 1859, the Sisters incorporated their work, creating the network of health care services known as Providence Health & Services. In 1891, they founded St. Elizabeth Hospital (now PeaceHealth Southwest Medical Center), the Pacific Northwest's first permanent hospital opened with 13 beds. The sisters later established several schools and hospitals in Washington, Montana, Oregon, Alaska, British Columbia, and California.

Providence Health System was managed by the Sisters of Providence until December 31, 2009, when a Council of Sponsors known as Providence Ministries was created to serve as the canonical owners.

Providence Health & Services formally came into being January 1, 2006, with the merger of Providence Health System, the progenitor firm, and Providence Services, based in Spokane and the parent company of Providence Health Care.  Providence Health Care itself was formed in 1998 when six hospitals operating under Providence Services incorporated into a single entity.  The hospitals making up Providence Health Care constituted the Dominican Network, which "became part of" Providence Services in 1993.

In 2003, Health Management Associates purchased the Providence Health System properties in Central Washington including Providence Yakima Medical Center (formerly St. Elizabeth) and Toppenish Hospital.

In 2012, Providence allied itself with Seattle, Washington-based Swedish Health Services, at which time Swedish's CEO Dr. Rod Hochman, was hired by Providence. In April 2013, Hochman became the president and CEO of Providence.  In 2014, Providence entered in an affiliation with Pacific Medical Centers (PacMed). PacMed joined Swedish as part of Providence's Western HealthConnect division.

Providence Medical Group is the "physician division" of Providence.  It operates more than 250 clinics in neighborhoods throughout Alaska, California, Montana, Oregon and Washington. Providence Medical Group is part of Providence Health & Services. Providence Medical Group employs more than 1,600 physicians offering expertise in family medicine, internal medicine, pediatrics, obstetrics/gynecology, dermatology and other specialties.

Providence Health & Services provides outpatient services, transitional care, home and hospice care, substance abuse programs, mental health treatment, prevention and wellness programs, long-term care, and assisted living and housing. Providence Health Plan provides or administers health coverage to more than 375,000 members nationwide.

The company has a program in place designed to reduce the amount of food scraps that it sends to landfills.

Sponsorship 

In 2014, Providence signed a sponsorship deal with the Portland Timbers of Major League Soccer, naming Timbers' stadium Providence Park. They became the jersey sponsor for Seattle Sounders FC in 2023, which drew criticism from fans.

Controversies 
In 2018, Providence paid its chief executive, Rod Hochman, more than $10 million.

A New York Times investigation in May 2020 revealed that Providence Health System obtained more than half of a billion in government funds which were intended to prevent health care providers from going under during the coronavirus pandemic. At that time, Providence Health System had nearly $12 billion in cash reserves. By making investments with that fund, it generated approximately $1 billion in profits per year.

A second The New York Times investigation found that Providence Hospital system had instituted a program to pressure low-income patients to make payments to the company, even though the hospital was supposed to give them free care in exchange for tax benefits. The program called "Rev-Up" (Rev standing for revenue) was created shortly after the company's expensive merger with St. Joseph Health and was suggested by the consulting firm McKinsey & Company. Hospital staff were instructed to not inform patients that they may qualify for free care, and instead received training on how to approach patients and pressure them to pay. When patients refused, they were often sent to debt collection, a violation of some state laws that entitled low-income patents to free care, leading to a suit from the Attorney General of Washington. Providence denies that anything they did was illegal, however the company said they would stop using debt collectors and refund some payments.

Hospitals 

Providence has 51 hospitals and over 1,100 clinics in seven U.S. states . These facilities include the following:

Alaska 
Providence Alaska Medical Center
Providence Kodiak Island Medical Center
Providence Seward Medical and Care Center
Providence Valdez Medical Center

California 

Providence Holy Cross Medical Center
Providence Little Company of Mary Medical Center (San Pedro)
Providence Little Company of Mary Medical Center (Torrance)
Petaluma Valley Hospital
Providence Saint Joseph Medical Center
Providence Cedars-Sinai Tarzana Medical Center
Providence Medical Institute
Providence Saint John's Health Center
Providence Redwood Memorial Hospital
Queen of the Valley Medical Center
Santa Rosa Memorial Hospital
St. Mary's Medical Center-Apple Valley
Providence Mission Hospital Mission Viejo
Providence Mission Hospital Laguna Beach
St. Joseph Hospital Orange
St. Jude Medical Center (Fullerton)
St.Joseph Hospital – Eureka

Montana 
St. Joseph Medical Center
St. Patrick Hospital and Health Sciences Center

Oregon 

Providence Hood River Memorial Hospital
Providence Medford Medical Center
Providence Milwaukie Hospital
Providence Newberg Medical Center
Providence Portland Medical Center
Providence Seaside Hospital
Providence St. Vincent Medical Center
Providence Willamette Falls Medical Center

Washington 

Providence Centralia Hospital
Providence Regional Medical Center Everett
Providence St. Peter Hospital
Swedish Health Services
Kadlec Regional Medical Center
The following were originally part of the Dominican Network and came into Providence Health & Services upon its formation in 2006

 Deer Park Health Center & Hospital
 Holy Family Hospital of Spokane
 Mount Carmel Hospital of Colville
 Providence Sacred Heart Medical Center and Children's Hospital (Spokane)
 St. Joseph's Hospital of Chewelah
 St. Mary Medical Center of Walla Walla

Texas 
Covenant Medical Center – Lubbock
Covenant Children's Hospital – Lubbock
Grace Medical Center – Lubbock
Covenant Health Plainview
Covenant Health Levelland

References

External links 
 Providence Health & Services (official website)
 Providence Archives (official archives)

 
Catholic health care
Companies based in Renton, Washington
Healthcare in Washington (state)
Hospital networks in the United States
Companies established in 1859
1859 establishments in Washington Territory
Medical and health organizations based in Washington (state)
Catholic hospital networks in the United States